Concerts have been held at the Millennium Stadium in Cardiff, Wales, since the stadium's opening in 1999. The musicians who have played at the stadium include Tina Turner, Beyoncé, Spice Girls, The Rolling Stones, Rod Stewart, Paul McCartney, Madonna, Steps and Rihanna. The highest concert audience at the stadium was 73,354, who saw U2 in 2009. In 2018 Ed Sheeran performed for a record-breaking 4 nights at the Stadium on his ÷ Tour. The stadium's total seating capacity for sporting events is 73,434.

History
The first concert held was on New Year's Eve 1999 when the Manic Street Preachers headlined Manic Millennium, followed two days later by a concert for the BBC's Songs of Praise programme, with Cliff Richard performing his UK number-one single "The Millennium Prayer". This event attracted an attendance of 66,000.

During 2003, the stadium established a new in-house promotions and events department to attract major concerts to the stadium, taking over from SJM Concerts. The stadium's General Manager Paul Sergeant at the time said of the change, "We looked at the current way our business was run, (and) realized that if we do it ourselves and have direct contact with the event owners and promoters...we will be able to offer an improved service".

At the end of January 2005, the stadium hosted a Tsunami Relief Cardiff, a tsunami relief concert, in aid of victims of the 2004 Indian Ocean tsunami, with Eric Clapton headlining the event. On 22 August 2009, U2 played at the stadium as part of their European leg of their U2 360° Tour, playing to a record-breaking concert attendance for a concert at the stadium of 73,354.

In 2005 the stadium installed an "Arena Partition Drape System" – a 1,100 kg black curtain made up of 12 drapes measuring  x  – to vary the audience from a capacity of over 73,000 down to between 12,000 and 46,000, depending on the four different positions that it can be hung. The curtains can be stored in the roof of the stadium when not in use. The £1m cost of the curtain was funded by the stadium, the Millennium Commission, its caterers Letherby and Christopher (Compass Group) and by the then Wales Tourist Board. The curtain was supplied by Blackout Ltd.

It was feared that music concerts and sporting events would take business away from local shops, however, David Hughes Lewis, chairman of Cardiff Retail Partnership, said in 2005 that "despite initial concerns that major events in the Millennium Stadium hit trading in the shops, it now believed such events had a positive impact...When people come to Cardiff for the concerts, they more often than not arrive the night before and they'll spend the morning shopping".

Concerts

See also 
 Music of Cardiff
 List of events held at the Millennium Stadium
 List of concerts at the National Stadium, Cardiff Arms Park
 List of highest-grossing concert tours

Notes

External links 
 Upcoming events at the Millennium Stadium website

Events in Cardiff
Lists of events by venue
Concerts
Music in Cardiff
Music events in the United Kingdom